Andrew Fitzgerald  (born December 10, 1990) is an American professional basketball player for Ehime Orange Vikings in Japan. He played college basketball for Oklahoma University.

Career statistics 

|-
| align="left" | 2015–16
| align="left" | Kanazawa
|50 ||4 || 23.1 ||.526  || .200 ||.773 || 6.6 || 1.0 || .6 ||.2  || 16.3
|-
| align="left" | 2016–17
| align="left" | Kanazawa
|50 || || 21.2 ||.558  || .000 ||.784 || 7.3 || 1.2 || .6 ||.4  || 16.2
|-
| align="left" | 2017–18
| align="left" | Kanazawa
|60 ||60 || 28.1 ||.553  || .000 ||.722 || 8.8 || 2.1 || .8 ||.4  || 20.4
|-

References

1990 births
Living people
American expatriate basketball people in France
American expatriate basketball people in Japan
American expatriate basketball people in Poland
American men's basketball players
Basketball players from Baltimore
Ehime Orange Vikings players
Kanazawa Samuraiz players
Oklahoma Sooners men's basketball players
Power forwards (basketball)